Ionuț is a Romanian masculine given name. The English equivalent is Johnny. Notable persons with that name include:

 Ionuț Andrei (born 1985), Romanian bobsledder 
 Ionuț Badea (born 1975), Romanian footballer 
 Ionuț Bălan (born 1978), Romanian footballer
 Ionuț Bâlbă (born 1981), Romanian footballer
 Ionuț Costache (born 1983), Romanian footballer
 Ionuț Dimofte (born 1984), Romanian rugby union footballer
 Ionuț Dobroiu (born 1988), Romanian  footballer 
 Ionuț Dragomir (born 1974), Romanian footballer
 Ionuț Florea (born 1980), Romanian futsal player 
 Ionuț Gălițeanu (born 1979), Romanian ski mountaineer and mountain runner
 Ionuț Gheorghe (born 1984), Romanian boxer
 Ionuț Iftimoaie (born 1978), Romanian kickboxer
 Ionuț Dan Ion (born 1981), Romanian professional boxer
 Ionuț Irimia (born 1979), Romanian professional footballer
 Ionuț Lupescu (born 1968), Romanian  footballer 
 Ionuț Mazilu (born 1982), Romanian footballer 
 Ionuț Popa (1953–2020), Romanian footballer and coach
 Ionuț Radu (born 1997), Romanian footballer
 Ionuț Cristian Stancu (born 1983), Romanian footballer 
 Ionuț Stănescu (born 1979), Romanian handballer 
 Ionuț Țăran (born 1987), Romanian luger

See also
Ioan
Ion (name)
Ionel

Romanian masculine given names